Defending champion Shingo Kunieda defeated Maikel Scheffers in the final, 6–0, 6–0 to win the men's singles wheelchair tennis title at the 2009 US Open. It was his second US Open singles title and eighth major singles title overall, and he dropped just four games en route.

There was no edition of the event in 2008 due to a scheduling conflict with the 2008 Summer Paralympics. This issue would continue to affect US Open wheelchair tennis until 2021.

Seeds

 Shingo Kunieda (champion)
 Stéphane Houdet (quarterfinals)

Draw

Finals

External links
Main Draw

Wheelchair Men's Singles
U.S. Open, 2009 Men's Singles